
Gmina Stary Dzików is a rural administrative district in Lubaczów County, Subcarpathian Voivodeship, in south-eastern Poland.

Villages
Gmina Stary Dzików contains the villages: Cewków, Koziejówka, Moszczanica, Nowy Dzików, Stary Dzików, Ułazów and Witki.

Neighbouring gminas
Gmina Stary Dzików borders on the districts of Adamówka, Obsza, Tarnogród and Wiązownica.

References

Polish official population figures 2006

Stary Dzikow
Lubaczów County